Renealmia is a plant genus in the family Zingiberaceae. Its members are native to tropical Africa and tropical America (Latin America and the West Indies). In Peru, fruits and tubers are sources of indigenous dyes. and indigenous medical treatments for leishmania and malaria In Colombia, it is used to treat snakebite. Bracts and leaves can serve as phytotelmata, retaining small quantities of water that offer habitat for other organisms.

Species include:

 Renealmia acreana Maas - Brazil (Acre State)
 Renealmia africana Benth. - western and central Africa from Togo to Angola
 Renealmia alborosea K.Schum. in H.G.A.Engler  - Cameroon
 Renealmia alpinia (Rottb.) Maas - Latin America and the West Indies from Veracruz and Puerto Rico south to Bolivia
 Renealmia alticola Maas - Colombia
 Renealmia angustifolia K.Schum. in H.G.A.Engler - Espírito Santo
 Renealmia aromatica (Aubl.) Griseb. - Latin America and the West Indies from Veracruz and Puerto Rico south to Bolivia
 Renealmia asplundii Maas - Colombia, Ecuador, Peru
 Renealmia aurantifera Maas - Ecuador
 Renealmia batangana K.Schum. in H.G.A.Engler - Cameroon
 Renealmia battenbergiana Cummins ex Baker  - Ghana, Ivory Coast
 Renealmia brachythyrsa Loes. - Cameroon
 Renealmia bracteata De Wild. & T.Durand - Congo-Brazzaville, Zaïre, Uganda
 Renealmia brasiliensis K.Schum. in H.G.A.Engler - Brazil
 Renealmia breviscapa Poepp. & Endl. - Brazil, Bolivia, Peru, Ecuador, Colombia 
 Renealmia cabrae De Wild. & T.Durand - Congo-Brazzaville, Zaïre, Gabon, Cameroon
 Renealmia caucana Maas - Colombia
 Renealmia cernua (Sw. ex Roem. & Schult.) J.F.Macbr. - Latin America from Chiapas to Peru
 Renealmia chalcochlora K.Schum. in H.G.A.Engler  - Colombia
 Renealmia chiriquina Standl.  - Panamá
 Renealmia choroniensis Maas - Veenzuela
 Renealmia chrysotricha Petersen - Rio de Janeiro
 Renealmia cincinnata (K.Schum.) T.Durand & Schinz - west-central Africa from Ivory Coast to Congo-Brazzaville
 Renealmia concinna Standl. - Costa Rica, Panama, Colombia
 Renealmia congesta Maas - Costa Rica, Panama
 Renealmia congoensis Gagnep. - Congo-Brazzaville, Zaïre, Gabon, Cameroon, Cabinda
 Renealmia congolana De Wild. & T.Durand - Congo-Brazzaville, Zaïre, Rwanda, Uganda, Tanzania
 Renealmia costaricensis Standl. - Costa Rica, Panama, Colombia, Ecuador
 Renealmia cuatrecasasii Maas - Colombia, Ecuador
 Renealmia cylindrica Maas & H.Maas - Panama, Colombia, Ecuador
 Renealmia densiflora Urb. - Haiti
 Renealmia densispica Koechlin - Gabon, Cameroon
 Renealmia dermatopetala K.Schum. in H.G.A.Engler - Brazil, Bolivia
 Renealmia dewevrei De Wild. & T.Durand - Zaïre
 Renealmia dolichocalyx Maas - Ecuador
 Renealmia dressleri Maas - Panama
 Renealmia engleri K.Schum. in H.G.A.Engler  - Kenya, Tanzania, Zambia
 Renealmia erythrocarpa Standl. - Costa Rica, Panama, Nicaragua
 Renealmia ferruginea Maas - Colombia
 Renealmia floribunda K.Schum. in H.G.A.Engler - Trinidad and northern South America
 Renealmia foliifera Standl. - Costa Rica, Panama, Colombia
 Renealmia fragilis Maas - Colombia, Ecuador
 Renealmia guianensis Maas - Guianas, Venezuela, northern Brazil, Venezuelan Antilles 
 Renealmia heleniae Maas - Panama
 Renealmia jamaicensis (Gaertn.) Horan. - Bahamas, Cuba, Jamaica, Hispaniola, Puerto Rico
 Renealmia krukovii Maas - Colombia, Peru, Brazil
 Renealmia laxa K.Schum. in H.G.A.Engler  - Cameroon
 Renealmia ligulata Maas - Costa Rica, Panama, Colombia, Ecuador
 Renealmia longifolia K.Schum. in H.G.A.Engler  - Liberia, Ivory Coast
 Renealmia lucida Maas - Costa Rica, Colombia, Ecuador
 Renealmia macrocolea K.Schum. in H.G.A.Engler - Togo, Cabinda, Cameroon, Gabon 
 Renealmia maculata Stapf in H.Johnston - Liberia, Ivory Coast
 Renealmia mannii Hook.f. - Bioko
 Renealmia matogrossensis Maas - Mato Grosso
 Renealmia mexicana Klotzsch ex Petersen - southern Mexico, Central America, Venezuela
 Renealmia microcalyx Maas & H.Maas - Brazil, Venezuela
 Renealmia monosperma Miq. - widespread from Panama east to the Guianas and south to Bolivia
 Renealmia nicolaioides Loes. - Venezuela, Colombia, Ecuador, Peru, Brazil 
 Renealmia oligosperma K.Schum. in H.G.A.Engler - Ecuador
 Renealmia oligotricha Maas - Ecuador
 Renealmia orinocensis Rusby - Venezuela, Guianas
 Renealmia pacifica (Maas) Maas & H.Maas - southern Mexico, Guatemala, El Salvador
 Renealmia pallida Maas - Peru
 Renealmia petasites Gagnep. - Brazil
 Renealmia pirrensis Maas & H.Maas - Panama
 Renealmia pluriplicata Maas - Colombia, Ecuador, Central America
 Renealmia polyantha K.Schum. in H.G.A.Engler - Gabon, Cameroon, Congo-Brazzaville
 Renealmia polypus Gagnep. - Gabon, Cameroon, Congo-Brazzaville, Cabinda
 Renealmia puberula Steyerm. - Colombia, Ecuador
 Renealmia purpurea Maas & H.Maas - Peru
 Renealmia pycnostachys K.Schum. in H.G.A.Engler  - Minas Gerais (probably extinct)
 Renealmia pyramidalis (Lam.) Maas - Lesser Antilles
 Renealmia racemosa Poepp. & Endl. - Peru, Bolivia
 Renealmia reticulata Gagnep. - Espírito Santo, Rio de Janeiro
 Renealmia sancti-thomae I.M.Turner - São Tomé
 Renealmia scaposa Maas - Costa Rica
 Renealmia sessilifolia Gagnep. - Ecuador
 Renealmia stellulata Steyerm. - Ecuador, Peru
 Renealmia stenostachys K.Schum. in H.G.A.Engler  - Cameroon
 Renealmia striata (Stokes) Govaerts ex Maas - Jamaica
 Renealmia thyrsoidea (Ruiz & Pav.) Poepp. & Endl. - Brazil, Bolivia, Venezuela, Peru, Ecuador, Colombia, Suriname, Guyana, Trinidad, Panama, Costa Rica
 Renealmia urbaniana Loes. - Brazil, Peru, Ecuador, Colombia
 Renealmia vallensis Maas - Colombia
 Renealmia variegata Maas & H.Maas - Ecuador, Colombia, Panama
 Renealmia wurdackii Maas - Peru, Ecuador

References

 
Zingiberaceae genera
Taxonomy articles created by Polbot